Hyperion Pictures (also known as Hyperion Films or Hyperion Studios or Hyperion Animation) is an American film production and Distribution company founded by Thomas L. Wilhite, who had previously been the head of motion picture and television produced for and owned by The Walt Disney Company, and writer/director Willard Carroll. The company produces both live-action and animated productions such as The Brave Little Toaster, The Brave Little Toaster Goes to Mars, The Brave Little Toaster to the Rescue and The Runestone.

History 
A subsidiary of the company is its animation division, Hyperion Animation Company, Inc. which has produced animated feature films and television series, including its most successful media franchises: The Brave Little Toaster, The Brave Little Toaster Goes to Mars, The Brave Little Toaster to the Rescue, The Itsy Bitsy Spider and The Oz Kids. In 1998, the company produced the live-action film Playing by Heart for Miramax. Also, on December 9, 1998, it signed a deal with Showtime in order to develop a telefilm based on the hit book series Bad News Ballet.

On October 5, 1999, Hyperion, along with Disney's animation designer Bruce W. Smith, launched a joint venture Jambalaya Studios to produce shows aimed at a black audience. On September 22, 2002, Hyperion Pictures decided to expand into a memoir and a series of pulp novels into feature film production.

The studio has been dormant since 2007, but their website was recently updated in 2019 in where it was under construction. It then returned in a year later. However, the company is not involved with The Proud Family: Louder and Prouder.

Accolades 
The first Brave Little Toaster received an Primetime Emmy Award for Outstanding Animated Program nomination and a Special Jury recognition from the Sundance Film Festival.

List of notable Hyperion features and television productions

Feature films 
 Nutcracker: The Motion Picture (1986, with The Kushner-Locke Company)
 The Runestone (1990)
 Playing by Heart (1998, with Miramax)
 Tom's Midnight Garden (1999)
 My Louisiana Sky (2001)
 Three Way (2004, with Brainstorm Media)
 Marigold (2007)

Short films 
 Chunks of Life (1994, with MTV)
 The Need (2006)

Television series 
 Amazing Stories (1985–1987) - Season 2, Episode 16: "Family Dog" (1987, with NBC, Universal Television, Amblin Entertainment and The Kushner-Locke Company)
 Bone Chillers (1996, with ABC)
 ARK, the Adventures of Animal Rescue Kids (1997–1998, with Discovery Kids)

List of Hyperion Animation productions

Theatrical feature films 

 The Brave Little Toaster (1987, with The Kushner-Locke Company)
 Rover Dangerfield (1991, with The Kushner-Locke Company, and Warner Bros. Animation)
 Robin Harris' Bébé's Kids (1992, with Paramount Pictures and Jambalaya Studios)

Direct-to-video
 The Brave Little Toaster to the Rescue (1997, with The Kushner-Locke Company, and Walt Disney Home Video) 
 The Brave Little Toaster Goes to Mars (1998, with The Kushner-Locke Company, and Walt Disney Home Video) 
 We Wish You a Merry Christmas (1999) 
 O' Christmas Tree (1999) 
 Jingle Bells (1999) 
 The Tangerine Bear: Home in Time for Christmas! (2000, with Artisan Entertainment) 
 The Adventures of Tom Thumb and Thumbelina (2002, with Miramax)

TV film
 The Proud Family Movie (2005, with Jambalaya Studios and Disney Channel)

Short films 
 The Itsy Bitsy Spider (1992, with Paramount Pictures)
 1001 Nights: An Animation Symphony (1998, with Los Angeles Philharmonic Orchestra)

Television series 
 The Itsy Bitsy Spider (1993–1996, with USA Network)
 The Oz Kids (1996-1997, with Canal+)
 Life with Louie (1994–1998, with Fox Kids)
 The Adventures of Hyperman (1995–1996, with CBS)
 Happily Ever After: Fairy Tales for Every Child (1995–2000, with HBO)
 The Proud Family (2001–2005, with Jambalaya Studios and Disney Channel)
 Da Boom Crew (2004–2005, with Jambalaya Studios and Kids' WB!)

Television specials 
 The Sissy Duckling (1999, with HBO)

References

External links 
 Official website 
 

 
1984 establishments in California
American companies established in 1984
Mass media companies established in 1984
Companies based in Los Angeles
Film production companies of the United States